Robert Connelly was a Scottish footballer who played as a midfielder for Port Vale between August 1921 and May 1932. He made 341 league and cup appearances, and helped the club to win the Third Division North title in 1929–30.

Career
Connelly started his career with Townhead Hibernians and later Shettleston Juniors, before joining Port Vale in August 1921. He scored his first senior goal in a 5–2 defeat by Bury at Gigg Lane on 8 October, before bagging a brace in a 5–2 win in the reverse fixture at The Old Recreation Ground seven days later. He scored seven goals in 38 Second Division appearances in the 1921–22 season, and three goals in 30 league and cup games in the 1922–23 season. He hit two goals in 25 games in the 1923–24 campaign, and two goals in 41 matches in the 1924–25 season. He hit the only goal of the match against rivals Stoke at the Victoria Ground on 20 September 1924. He featured 39 times in the 1925–26 season, netting two goals. He played 43 matches in the 1926–27 campaign, and then 45 games in the 1927–28 season. He featured 43 times in the 1928–29 relegation season. After picking up an injury, he was rested in November 1929 for the first time since January 1927, bringing to an end his 127 consecutive appearances. He played 25 league games in 1929–30, as the "Valiants" won the Third Division North title. He featured just once in 1930–31, and played just eight games in 1931–32. He left the club on a free transfer in May 1932 to join non-league Congleton Town. He briefly coached with FC Drumcondra in Ireland and in Amsterdam in The Netherlands, before returning  to Scotland where he and his wife ran a tobacconists shop in Sword Street in Dennistoun in Glasgow for a short time before working as a Locomotive Works Labourer at Cowlairs in Springburn, Glasgow. Stanley Matthews in his Autobiography "Feet First", recounts how he followed Port Vale as a boy and hero worshipped Bob Connelly. He died at Law Junction Hospital on 21 October 1943 of heart failure. He is buried at Cadder Cemetery in Bishopbriggs, East Dunbartonshire, Scotland.

Career statistics
Source:

References

Footballers from Glasgow
Scottish footballers
Association football midfielders
Glasgow United F.C. players
Port Vale F.C. players
Congleton Town F.C. players
English Football League players
Scottish Junior Football Association players
1901 births
1943 deaths